OfficeSuite is a cross-platform office suite application developed by MobiSystems. It has versions for Android, iOS and Microsoft Windows (PC) and adds extensive PDF abilities to its compatibility with the most frequently used Microsoft Office file formats. The software has over 220 million downloads on Google Play and is among the top Android business applications.

OfficeSuite is preinstalled on devices by Sony, Amazon, Alcatel, Sharp, Toshiba, ZTE, Huawei, Kyocera and more.

History 
The software was first released as a mobile application on Palm OS in 2004 (incorporating older MobiSystems apps: Quick Spell, Quick Check and Quick Write), followed by Symbian in 2005.

Until 2009, OfficeSuite was mainly used as a reader. Later, MobiSystems received an inquiry by Sony for an Android-based office solution development, however it was required in just 12 weeks. Apparently the developers succeeded and Sony preinstalled the newly developed OfficeSuite on all of their Android devices in 2009.

The software debuted on iOS in 2013, and the first desktop client version for Windows appeared in 2016.

Besides the ability to connect to any cloud provider such as Google Drive, Box, iCloud, OneDrive and more, OfficeSuite offers storage space in MobiSystems`s proprietary cloud: MobiDrive. 

In 2018 the app was selected by Google to be among the few to receive the Android Excellence Award.

OfficeSuite components 

 OfficeSuite Documents - Text editor
 OfficeSuite Mail - Email  with calendar
 OfficeSuite Sheets - Spreadsheet editor
 OfficeSuite PDF - PDF viewer and editor
 OfficeSuite Slides - Presentation programs

Types of licenses

Android: 

 OfficeSuite Free version - upgradable to either OfficeSuite Pro or *OfficeSuite Personal/Premium
 OfficeSuite Pro Trial - upgradable to Office Suite Pro
 OfficeSuite Pro - upgradable to *OfficeSuite Personal/Premium

iOS: 

 OfficeSuite Free - upgradable to either OfficeSuite Pro or *OfficeSuite Personal/Premium
 OfficeSuite Pro - upgradable to *OfficeSuite Personal/Premium

Windows: 

 OfficeSuite Basic - free version
 *OfficeSuite Personal
 OfficeSuite Group
 OfficeSuite Business

Different prices and plans for Personal, Group and Business licenses are available.

*OfficeSuite Personal/Premium offers cross-platform usage with a single license.

Software versions' features 

 OfficeSuite is compatible with Microsoft Word, Microsoft Excel, Microsoft PowerPoint, and Adobe PDF files.
 OfficeSuite Pro is compatible with all of the above and is able to print, convert PDF to Word, Excel, ePUB, save as PDF and could create password protected files. It has a track changes option.
 OfficeSuite Personal/Premium is compatible with all of the above, but it can also add camera photos, PDF annotations, save as CSV and create conditional formatting in Excel. It also introduces the cross-platform functionalities and enables the users to install OfficeSuite on all of the three platforms (Android, iOS and Windows) using a single license purchase.
The software can edit and manage the files, as well as format text font, color, size, and style, and has other features common to office suite software.

Supported file formats 
OfficeSuite offers full compatibility with Microsoft formats on all platforms. The software also has additional support for common formats (that may vary for different platforms) and a PDF module that enables users to open, edit and export to PDF files, including PDF camera scanning.

OfficeSuite for Android supports 
Open files: DOC, DOCX, DOCM, XLS, XLSX, XLSM, PPT, PPTX, PPS, PPSX, PPTM, PPSM, RTF, TXT, LOG, CSV, EML, ZIP, ODT, ODS, OD

Save/Save as files: DOC, DOCX, DOCM, XLS, XLSX, XLSM, PPT, PPTX, PPS, PPSX, PPTM, PPSM, RTF, TXT, LOG, CSV, EML, ZIP, ODT, ODS, ODP

OfficeSuite for iOS supports 
Open files: DOX, DOTX, DOCM, DOC, TXT, RTF, ODT (partial support), XSLX, XLTX, XLSM, XLS, CSV, PDF, PPTX, PPSX, POTX, PPTM, PPSM, POTM, PPT, POT, PPS.

Save/Save as files: DOX, DOTX, DOCM, DOC, TXT, RTF, ODT (partial support), XSLX, XLTX, XLSM, XLS, CSV, PDF, PPTX, PPSX, POTX, PPTM, PPSM, POTM, PPT, POT, PPS.

OfficeSuite for Windows supports 
Open files: DOX, DOTX, DOCM, DOC, TXT, RTF, ODT (partial support), XSLX, XLTX, XLSM, XLS, CSV, PDF, PPTX, PPSX, POTX, PPTM, PPSM, POTM, PPT, POT, PPS.

Save/Save as files: DOCX, DOTX, DOCM, DOC, TXT, RTF, XLSX, XLTX, XLSM, XLS, CSV, PDF, XPS, PPTX, PPSX, POTX, PPTM, PPSM, POTM, PPT, POT, PPS.

Languages

OfficeSuite for Android 
Arabic, Bengali, Bosnian, Bulgarian, Catalan, Chinese (Traditional), Chinese (Hong Kong), Chinese (Simplified Chinese), Chinese (Taiwan), Croatian, Czech, Danish, Dutch, English, Estonian, Finnish, French, French (Canada), German, Greek (Modern), Hebrew, Hindi, Hungarian, Italian, Japanese, Kannada (India), Korean, Latvian, Lithuanian, Macedonian, Malay, Malayalam (India), Marathi (India), Norwegian Bokmål, Panjabi (Punjabi), Persian (Farsi), Polish, Portuguese (Brazil), Portuguese (Portugal), Romanian, Russian, Serbian, Slovak, Slovene, Spanish (LATAM), Spanish (Spain), Swedish, Tagalog, Tamil (India), Telugu, Thai, Turkish, Ukrainian, Vietnamese.

OfficeSuite for IOS 
English, French, German, Hindi, Italian, Japanese, Russian, Simplified Chinese, Spanish, Thai.

OfficeSuite for Windows (PC) 
English, French, German, Hindi, Italian, Japanese, Russian, Simplified Chinese, Spanish, Thai.

See also
 Microsoft Office

References

External links 

2004 software
Android (operating system) software
IOS software
Word processors
Office suites